Bob, Bobby, or Robert Bird may refer to:

 Robert Montgomery Bird (1806–1854), American novelist, playwright, and physician
 Robert Bird (Welsh politician) (1839–1909), Welsh Liberal Party politician, mayor of Cardiff 1883
 Robert Merttins Bird (1788–1853), British civil servant in the Bengal Presidency
 Sir Robert Bird, 2nd Baronet (1876–1960), British Conservative Party politician, Member of Parliament (MP) for Wolverhampton West 1922–1929 and 1931–1945
 Robert Byron Bird (1924–2020), chemical engineer and professor emeritus
 Bobby Bird, musician
 Bob Bird, Scottish newspaper editor
 Bob Bird (politician) (born 1951), political activist and teacher
 Bob Bird (footballer) (1875–1946), former Australian rules footballer

See also
 Robert Byrd (disambiguation)
 Bird (surname)